Antoine-Sébastien Plamondon  ( – 1895) was an artist in Quebec, who painted mainly portraits and religious images, the latter commissioned primarily by churches in and around Quebec City. As a young man, he had traveled to France and studied painting in Paris for four years, with such portraitists as Jean-Baptiste Paulin Guérin.

Life 
Plamondon was born in 1804 (or 1802) at L'Ancienne-Lorette, Quebec, the son of the village grocer and his wife. He had at least two siblings. He went to school in Saint-Roch, a suburb of Quebec City, after which he was apprenticed to Joseph Légaré (1795–1855), a picture restorer and amateur painter.

In 1826 at the age of 22, Plamondon travelled to Paris, where he studied with classical portraitists such as Jean-Baptiste Paulin Guérin (1783–1855). Works from this period are scarce.

In the summer of 1830, Plamondon returned from France to Quebec. Paris had become unstable in the days of the July Revolution, which resulted in the downfall of the main Bourbon line and installation of Louis-Philippe of France as "King of the French". In Quebec he specialized in portraits of living subjects. He also did religious paintings (commissioned by various churches and religious orders around Quebec City), generally based on engravings of Old Masters of Europe, which was a common practice among artists of his time. His portraits were notable for his full-face, close-up, and tightly composed style, as well as representations of the latest styles of clothing. His later portraits showed more roundness in the modelling and far more space in the composition.

By 1850 Plamondon had moved several miles upriver to the country at Neuville, with his widowed mother, a brother, and a sister. He lived there for the remainder of his life. Much of his work during this period continued to be religious paintings, copies of Old Masters, commissioned by local churches. Plamondon's self-portrait of 1882 was probably his last work.

Honors
He was made a member of the Royal Canadian Academy of Arts.

Personal life
Plamondon never married. He died in Neuville in 1895, where his mother, and a brother and sister had lived with him for years.

He was a lifelong monarchist and supporter of the Conservative Party, a friend of Sir George-Étienne Cartier and Sir Étienne Taché. He broke with the Conservatives over their execution in 1885 of Louis Riel, a Métis who fought for the rights of his people in Canada. They had developed as a separate ethnic culture, descended from indigenous, French and English peoples. At the time of Riel's leadership, they were concentrated in the Red River area. The Métis are now formally recognized as a First Nation by the national government.

Gallery

References

External links 
  
 Biography at the Dictionary of Canadian Biography Online

Canadian portrait painters
19th-century Canadian painters
Canadian male painters
1895 deaths
Year of birth uncertain
19th-century Canadian male artists
1804 births
Members of the Royal Canadian Academy of Arts